Sikandar Sanam (21 September 1960 – 5 November 2012), born Mohammad Sikander, was a Pakistani stage artist, singer, actor, and stand up comedian.

Initially part of Umer Shareef's closest associates he'd later develop a solo career mainly by making parodies of modern Bollywood classics such as Tere Naam (2003) while he also released albums, his songs also often being parodies.

Early life 
Of Kutchi ethnic background, Sikandar Sanam was born Mohammad Sikander into a family of artists, his father Syed Abdul Sattar Shoqeen Jetpuri being a famous Gujarati poet.

Career
Sikander Sanam started performing on-stage as a child artist and singer. He preferred acting over singing and decided to enter show business. He changed his name from Mohammad Sikandar to Sikandar Sanam (Sanam meaning beloved in Urdu).

Death
Sanam died of liver cancer on 5 November 2012. He left behind his wife, four sons, and two daughters.

Sanam's funeral was offered at the Siddiqui Masjid in Bohra Pir. Several stage artists including Umer Sharif, Rauf Lala, Muhammad Ifraheem, Saleem Afridi, Shakeel Siddiqui, and Aftab Alam attended the prayer. He was buried at the Korangi graveyard karachi
.

Filmography

Stage shows
 Bohat Achay Bhai Bohat Achay
 Agwa Bara-e-Tawan
 Direct Hawaldar
 Kaloo Saloo Aur Maloo
 Comedy King's
 Behropia
 Chand Bar-e-Farokht
 One Day Eid Match
 Beauty Parlour
 Flight No 420
 Doctor Aur Qasai
 Eid Tere Naam
 Hanste Raho Chalte Raho
 Hum Sab Eik Hain
 Hum Se Milo
 Laal Qiley Ki Rani Lalokhet ka Raja
 Loot Sale
 Mamu Mazaq Mat Karo
 Akbar-e-Azam in Pakistan
 BEHRUPIYA UMER SHARIF
 Yeh Hai Naya Zamana 
 Bakra Munna Bhai 
 Paying Guest 
 Dulha 2002 
 Hanste Raho Chalte Raho 
 Meri Bhi to Eid Karade 
 Nayee Ammi Purane Abba
 Majno Laila Boyee Ghela (Memoni stage drama)
 Eid aashiqoon ki
 Good Luck Moin Akhter
 Eid Mubarak
 BEBIA MOIN AKHTER
 Bin Bulaye Baraati

Pakistani films
 Chorron ke Ghar Chorri
 Zoor

Parody films
° Tere Naam 2
 pgl 2
 Khal Nayak 2

 Muqaddar Ka Sikandar 2
 Bhola Te Billa
 Sholay 2
 Rambo 007
 Ghanjini 2
 Dabbang 2
 Bodyguard 2
 Singham 2
 Agneepath 2
 Billu Barber 2
 Ra one 2
Hum Tum 2
Munna Bhai MBBS 2

Indian television
 Funjabi Chakde
 The Great Indian Laughter Challenge
 Comedy Champions
 Dabaangg 2

References

Pakistani male stage actors
1960 births
2012 deaths
Male actors from Karachi
Pakistani male comedians
Kutchi people
Pakistani people of Gujarati descent
Deaths from liver cancer